Jazhincë Lake is a mountain lake in Kosovo, found in the eastern part of the Sharr Mountains. On some sides the lake is surrounded by large rocks which makes it ideal for animals to hide or live in.

See also 

 Small Jažinačko Lake

References 

Jazhince
Jazhince
Šar Mountains